A list of films produced in Brazil in 1940:

See also
 1940 in Brazil

External links
Brazilian films of 1940 at the Internet Movie Database

Brazil
1940
Films